Philotas (lived 4th century BC) was a Macedonian soldier and noble from Upper Macedonia.

He was the father of Parmenion, the general of Alexander the Great (336 — 323 BC). Parmenion would go on to name his son after his father. It appears that he had two other sons, Asander and Agathon.

References

Smith, William (editor); Dictionary of Greek and Roman Biography and Mythology, "Philotas (1)", Boston (1867).

4th-century BC Macedonians
Ancient Macedonian soldiers
Upper Macedonians